Apollo Kironde (1915 – 21 April 2007) was a Ugandan lawyer and diplomat who served as the first ambassador to the United Nations (UN) from Uganda.

He was the scion of an ancient aristocratic family of the Nsenene (grasshopper clan).  His grandfather, Apollo Kaggwa, was a minister in the kingdom of Buganda when the British arrived, and served as a regent to the young Bugandan king Daudi Chwa until 1914, after which he remained Buganda's katikiro (prime minister) until 1926.  For his efforts, he was knighted by Queen Victoria, becoming the first African to be knighted.

His grandson and namesake, Apollo Kironde, was the second son of his first son Assanasio Sentenza and Bladina Kironde.  At an early age young Apollo showed a lot of promise and was sent abroad to school.  He studied to be a teacher and after many years of teaching went to England and read law at Middle Temple.  He went back to Uganda and was the first African to pass the bar there.

When the King of Buganda Mutesa II was exiled to the United Kingdom after a dispute with the colonial government, it was Apollo Kironde who went to England to win his freedom. Subsequently, he was invited to be a minister in the colonial government, a privilege formerly limited to the English.  When Uganda won its independence, he was named its first ambassador to the UN.

Kironde's daughter Katiti Kironde was the first African-American covergirl of a women's magazine.

References

1915 births
2007 deaths
Ugandan diplomats
Permanent Representatives of Uganda to the United Nations